This schema for the novel Ulysses was produced by its author, James Joyce, in November 1921 in order to help his friend, Valery Larbaud, prepare a public lecture on the novel, which Joyce was still writing at the time. The lecture took place on 7 December 1921 at the Maison des Amis des Livres bookshop and lending library, owned and run by Adrienne Monnier. The schema was shown to intimates of Joyce during the 1920s and was eventually published by Stuart Gilbert in 1930 in his book, James Joyce’s “Ulysses”: A Study. Gilbert’s typed copy of the schema is housed in the Harley K. Croessmann Collection of James Joyce at Southern Illinois University Carbondale.

See also
 Linati schema for Ulysses

Notes 

a.  Fuga per canonem: Latin for "fugue according to rule", a musical term for a round.

Ulysses (novel)